The Kira clan(吉良氏 - kira-shi) was a Japanese clan, descended from Emperor Seiwa (850–880), and was a cadet branch of the Ashikaga family from the Minamoto clan (Seiwa Genji). Ashikaga Mitsuuji, grandson of Ashikaga Yoshiuji (1189–1254) was the first to take the name of Kira.

History 
Kira Mitsusada sided first with his relative Ashikaga Takauji (1305–1358), the first Ashikaga shōgun, then passed over to the Southern Dynasty. He was defeated by Hatakeyama Kunikiyo (1360) and submitted to the Ashikaga shōguns.

In fact, the Kira, from Mikawa province, were a minor branch of the Minamoto clan, as they never had the rank of Shugo (Governor) of any province during the Kamakura period until the Sengoku period, they never possessed important domains and never represented a real power, in comparison with other grand Seiwa Genji families.

During the Tokugawa period, they were among the Kōke, a ranking below Daimyō. The Kira are famous for Kira Yoshinaka (1641–1703) and the Forty-seven rōnin vendetta.

References 

Kira clan
Ashikaga clan